Pope Eumenes was the 7th Pope and Patriarch of Alexandria, reigning from 129 to 141.

Eumenes was one of the most respected Christians in Alexandria, Egypt. He was chosen in July (Abib) in 129 during the reign of Emperor Hadrian. He also took over from Pope Justus as the second Dean of the Catechetical School of Alexandria.

During his time he ordained several Bishops, and he sent them to preach in all the provinces of Egypt, Nubia and to Pentapolis and to spread the good news of the Salvation.

The persecution of the Christians increased during his time and many were martyred. After reigning for thirteen years, he died on the 9th of Babah (19 October) in 141 AD.

References

Specific

141 deaths
2nd-century Popes and Patriarchs of Alexandria
Deans of the Catechetical School of Alexandria
Saints from Roman Egypt
2nd-century Christian saints
Year of birth unknown